The USTA Tennis Classic of Troy was a tournament for professional female tennis players played on outdoor clay courts. The event was classified as a $25,000 ITF Women's Circuit tournament. It was held annually in Troy, Alabama, United States from 2003 to 2012. The tournament was a $50,000 tournament until its last edition in 2012 where it was downgraded to $25,000.

Past finals

Singles

Doubles

External links 
 
 ITF search

Defunct tennis tournaments in the United States
ITF Women's World Tennis Tour
Hard court tennis tournaments in the United States
Recurring sporting events established in 2003
Recurring sporting events disestablished in 2012
Tennis tournaments in Alabama
2003 establishments in Alabama
2012 disestablishments in Alabama